Spain are an American rock band formed in Los Angeles, California in 1993, and led by singer/bassist Josh Haden. Their syncretic music contains elements of country, blues, folk, jazz, and slowcore. In a career spanning more than two decades, Spain has released five studio albums, a live album, and a best-of collection.

History 
Spain's debut album The Blue Moods of Spain, released in September 1995, featured the song "Spiritual", which has since become a standard, having been covered numerous times by artists including Johnny Cash, Soulsavers, Sean Wheeler and Zander Schloss, and by Haden's own father, jazz great Charlie Haden, who performed an instrumental version with jazz guitarist Pat Metheny on their acclaimed 1997 album Beyond The Missouri Sky (Short Stories). Spain's second album She Haunts My Dreams was recorded in 1999 on the Swedish island of Vaxholm, and contained performances by Swedish jazz pianist Esbjörn Svensson, guitarist Björn Olsson, and sometime R.E.M. and Beck drummer Joey Waronker. This album contained the song "Every Time I Try" which director Wim Wenders included in the soundtrack to The End of Violence. Spain's third album I Believe was released in 2001, and a compilation, Spirituals: The Best Of Spain, was released in 2003.

After a period of inactivity, Haden reformed the band with new members in 2007. This longest-running formation of the band crystallized with the lineup of Randy Kirk on keys and guitar, Matt Mayhall (of The Both) on drums, and Daniel Brummel on lead guitar and backing vocals. In 2012, this lineup released The Soul of Spain, the band's first new studio recording in 13 years, which "bears an undeniably brighter sound", and also features performances by Josh's sisters Petra Haden, Rachel Haden, and Tanya Haden, now known professionally as The Haden Triplets.

The Soul of Spain received critical praise in the European press, and the group completed several European tours including performances in Belgium, Denmark, Norway, France, Germany, The Netherlands, Switzerland, Italy, Spain, Portugal, and the United Kingdom. During this period, Dylan McKenzie was added to the group as a touring member on acoustic guitar, and in 2013, the touring lineup recorded The Morning Becomes Eclectic Session, a live album recorded at KCRW which also features The Haden Triplets. In 2013, the lineup of Haden, Mayhall, Brummel and Kirk reconvened to record another studio full-length, Sargent Place, which was produced by Gus Seyffert, mixed by Darrell Thorp and released on Dine Alone Records on November 4, 2014. The album contains Charlie Haden's last recorded performance, the song "You and I", and was given a four-star rating by AllMusic.

Personnel

Current members
Josh Haden (vocals, bass)

Former members
Matt Mayhall (drums)
Daniel Brummel (guitar)
Randy Kirk (keys, guitar)
Dylan McKenzie (acoustic guitar)
Evan Hartzell (drums)
Ken Boudakian (guitar)
Merlo Podlewski (guitar)

Discography

Albums
The Blue Moods of Spain (Restless Records, 1995)
She Haunts My Dreams (Restless Records, 1999)
I Believe (Restless Records, 2001)
Spirituals: The Best of Spain (Restless Records, 2003)
Blue Moods of Spain: A History, Pt. 1 (Diamond Soul Recordings, 2010)
Blue Moods of Spain: A History, Pt. 2 (Diamond Soul Recordings, 2011)
The Soul of Spain (Glitterhouse Records, 2012)
The Morning Becomes Eclectic Session (Glitterhouse Records, 2013)
Sargent Place (Dine Alone/Glitterhouse Records, 2014)
Carolina (Glitterhouse Records, 2016)
Live at the Love Song (Live) (Glitterhouse Records, 2017)
Mandala Brush (Glitterhouse Records, 2018)

Charted singles

References

External links

Fan site

Rock music groups from California
Musical groups established in 1993
Musical groups from Los Angeles
Restless Records artists
Dine Alone Records artists
Glitterhouse Records artists